The 2012–13 Alaska Aces season was the 27th season of the franchise in the Philippine Basketball Association (PBA).

Key dates
August 19: The 2012 PBA Draft took place in Robinson's Midtown Mall, Manila.
October 17: Calvin Abueva formally signed a contract with the Aces after his commitments with the San Sebastian Stags are finished following their elimination in the NCAA Final Four.

Draft picks

Roster

Philippine Cup

Eliminations

Standings

Game log

|- bgcolor="#edbebf" 
| 1
|  October 5
|  San Mig Coffee
|  83–103
|  Hontiveros (14)
|  dela Cruz (7)
|  Baguio, Casio (3)
|  Smart Araneta Coliseum
|  0–1
|  Boxscores
|- bgcolor="#edbebf" 
| 2
|  October 10
|  Meralco
|  86–93
|  Baguio (19)
|  Thoss (11)
|  Casio (5)
|  Smart Araneta Coliseum
|  0–2
|  Boxscores
|- bgcolor="#bbffbb" 
| 3
|  October 14
|  Barako Bull
|  102–86
|  Casio (24)
|  Baguio (7)
|  Casio, Baguio (4)
|  Smart Araneta Coliseum
|  1–2
|  Boxscores
|- bgcolor="#bbffbb" 
| 4
|  October 19
|  Petron Blaze
|  88–86
|  Baguio (21)
|  Abueva (16)
|  Casio (6)
|  Smart Araneta Coliseum
|  2–2
|  Boxscores
|- bgcolor="#bbffbb" 
| 5
|  October 26
|  Air21
|  92–81
|  Casio (19)
|  Abueva (12)
|  Casio (5)
|  Smart Araneta Coliseum
|  3–2
|  Boxscores
|- bgcolor="#bbffbb" 
| 6
|  October 28
|  Barangay Ginebra
|  87–69
|  Abueva (19)
|  Abueva (9)
|  Casio, Baguio (4)
|  Smart Araneta Coliseum
|  4–2
|  Boxscores

|- bgcolor="#bbffbb"
| 7
|  November 2
|  Talk 'N Text
|  94–92
|  Casio (25)
|  Hontiveros (9)
|  Thoss, Casio, Abueva (4)
|  Smart Araneta Coliseum
|  5–2
|  Boxscore
|- bgcolor="#edbebf" 
| 8
|  November 7
|  Rain or Shine
|  93–101
|  Baguio, Casio (16)
|  Thoss (7)
|  Baracael, Thoss (4)
|  Smart Araneta Coliseum
|  5–3
|  Boxscore
|- bgcolor="#edbebf" 
| 9
|  November 10
|  San Mig Coffee
|  68–77
|  Baguio (19)
|  Baguio (8)
|  Baguio (4)
|  Lapu-Lapu City
|  5–4
|  Boxscore
|- bgcolor="#edbebf" 
| 10
|  November 14
|  Air21
|  103–104
|  Baracael (24)
|  Abueva (10)
|  Thoss (4)
|  Smart Araneta Coliseum
|  5–5
|  Boxscore
|- bgcolor="#edbebf" 
| 11
|  November 18
|  Barangay Ginebra
|  93–96
|  Baracael (21)
|  Thoss (8)
|  Casio (6)
|  Smart Araneta Coliseum
|  5–6
|  Boxscore
|- bgcolor="#bbffbb"
| 12
|  November 28
|  Meralco
|  88–85
|  Abueva (20)
|  Abueva (18)
|  Abueva, Baracael, Baguio, Casio (3)
|  Smart Araneta Coliseum
|  6–6
|  Boxscore

|- bgcolor="#bbffbb" 
| 13
|  December 1
|  GlobalPort
|  101–95
|  Abueva (21)
|  Abueva (12)
|  Casio (5)
|  Dipolog
|  7–6
|  Boxscore
|- bgcolor="#bbffbb" 
| 14
|  December 5
|  Petron Blaze
|  79–71
|  Baguio (20)
|  Abueva (9)
|  Casio (6)
|  Smart Araneta Coliseum
|  8–6
|  Boxscore

Playoffs

Bracket

Game log

|- bgcolor="#bbffbb"
| 1
|  December 12
|  Meralco
|  90–84
|  Baguio (26)
|  Baguio, 2 others (8)
|  Casio (7)
|  Smart Araneta Coliseum
|  1–0
|  Boxscore
|- bgcolor="#bbffbb"
| 2
|  December 14
|  Meralco
|  88–70
|  Abueva, Baguio (18)
|  Abueva, dela Cruz (12)
|  Casio (8)
|  Smart Araneta Coliseum
|  2–0
|  Boxscore

|- bgcolor="#edbebf" 
| 1
|  December 19
|  Talk 'N Text
|  65–66
|  Thoss (14)
|  Abueva (17)
|  Baguio, Espinas (3)
|  Smart Araneta Coliseum
|  0–1
|  Boxscore
|- bgcolor="#bbffbb" 
| 2
|  December 21
|  Talk 'N Text
|  100–88
|  Casio (22)
|  Abueva (14)
|  Hontiveros (4)
|  Mall of Asia Arena
|  1–1
|  Boxscore
|- bgcolor="#edbebf" 
| 3
|  December 26
|  Talk 'N Text
|  79–93
|  Thoss (17)
|  Thoss (14)
|  Jazul (3)
|  Mall of Asia Arena
|  1–2
|  Boxscore
|-bgcolor="#bbffbb" 
| 4
|  December 28
|  Talk 'N Text
|  104–99
|  Casio (22)
|  Abueva (11)
|  Casio (5)
|  Mall of Asia Arena
|  2–2
|  Boxscore
|- bgcolor="#edbebf" 
| 5
|  December 30
|  Talk 'N Text
|  95–99
|  Abueva (19)
|  Abueva (11)
|  Baguio (5)
|  Mall of Asia Arena
|  2–3
|  Boxscore
|- bgcolor="#edbebf" 
| 6
|  January 4
|  Talk 'N Text
|  78–83
|  Abueva (23)
|  Abueva (13)
|  Casio (7)
|  Cuneta Astrodome
|  2–4
|  Boxscore

Commissioner's Cup

Eliminations

Standings

Game log

|- bgcolor="#bbffbb" 
| 1
|  February 9
|  Rain or Shine
|  83–81
|  Dozier (21)
|  Dozier (16)
|  Casio (5)
|  Smart Araneta Coliseum
|  1–0
|  boxscore
|- bgcolor="#bbffbb" 
| 2
|  February 13
|  Meralco
|  85–81
|  Dozier (27)
|  Dozier (14)
|  Casio (4)
|  Smart Araneta Coliseum
|  2–0
|  boxscore
|- bgcolor="#bbffbb" 
| 3
|  February 17
|  Barako Bull
|  77–73
|  Dozier (19)
|  Dozier (20)
|  Abueva, Thoss, Casio (3)
|  Smart Araneta Coliseum
|  3–0
|  boxscore
|- bgcolor="#bbffbb"
| 4
|  February 23
|  Barangay Ginebra
|  84–69
|  Dozier (21)
|  Dozier (11)
|  Casio (7)
|  Tubod, Lanao del Norte
|  4–0
|  boxscore

|- bgcolor="#bbffbb"
| 5
|  March 1
|  Talk 'N Text
|  92–69
|  Dozier (23)
|  Dozier (18)
|  Casio (6)
|  Smart Araneta Coliseum
|  5–0
|  boxscore
|- bgcolor="#edbebf" 
| 6
|  March 6
|  San Mig Coffee
|  75–68
|  Dozier (16)
|  Dozier (18)
|  Hontiveros (3)
|  Smart Araneta Coliseum
|  5–1
|  boxscore
|- bgcolor="#bbffbb"
| 7
|  March 8
|  Petron Blaze
|  83–73
|  Dozier (18)
|  Dozier (26)
|  Hontiveros (4)
|  Smart Araneta Coliseum
|  6–1
|  boxscore
|- bgcolor="#edbebf" 
| 8
|  March 15
|  Air21
|  74–68
|  Dozier (17)
|  Dozier, Abueva (12)
|  Baguio (4)
|  Smart Araneta Coliseum
|  6–2
|  boxscore
|- bgcolor="#bbffbb" 
| 9
|  March 17
|  GlobalPort
|  93–85
|  Dozier (26)
|  Dozier (18)
|  five players (2)
|  Smart Araneta Coliseum
|  7–2
|  boxscore
|- bgcolor="#edbebf" 
| 10
|  March 23
|  San Mig Coffee
|  83–84
|  Abueva (27)
|  Dozier (20)
|  Abueva, Hontiveros (4)
|  Smart Araneta Coliseum
|  7–3
|  boxscore
|- bgcolor="#bbffbb"
| 11
|  March 27
|  Petron Blaze
|  92–84
|  Dozier (26)
|  Dozier (18)
|  Baguio (6)
|  Smart Araneta Coliseum
|  8–3
|  boxscore

|- bgcolor="#bbffbb"
| 12
|  April 5
|  Rain or Shine
|  89–84
|  Dozier (23)
|  Abueva (13)
|  Casio (6)
|  Smart Araneta Coliseum
|  9–3
|  boxscore
|- bgcolor="#bbffbb"
| 13
|  April 10
|  Barangay Ginebra
|  102–93
|  Dozier (28)
|  Dozier (20)
|  Casio (8)
|  Smart Araneta Coliseum
|  10–3
|  boxscore
|- bgcolor="#bbffbb"
| 14
|  April 12
|  GlobalPort
|  93–92
|  Dozier (18)
|  Abueva (14)
|  Casio (11)
|  Smart Araneta Coliseum
|  11–3
|

Playoffs

Bracket

Game log

|- bgcolor="#bbffbb"
| 1
|  April 20
|  Air21
|  90–84
|  Casio (19)
|  Dozier (22)
|  Baguio (6)
|  Mall of Asia Arena
|  1–0
|  Boxscore

|- bgcolor="#edbebf" 
| 1
|  April 27
|  San Mig Coffee
|  69–71
|  Dozier (21)
|  Dozier (15)
|  Dozier, Abueva, Thoss (4)
|  Smart Araneta Coliseum
|  0–1
|  Boxscore
|- bgcolor="#bbffbb" 
| 2
|  April 29
|  San Mig Coffee
|  86–67
|  Dozier (28)
|  Dozier (27)
|  Casio (4)
|  Mall of Asia Arena
|  1–1
|  Boxscore
|- bgcolor="#bbffbb" 
| 3
|  May 8
|  San Mig Coffee
|  89–82
|  Abueva (24)
|  Dozier (19)
|  Baguio, Casio (4)
|  Smart Araneta Coliseum
|  2–1
|  Boxscore
|- bgcolor="#bbffbb" 
| 4
|  May 11
|  San Mig Coffee
|  83–78
|  Baguio (16)
|  Dozier (14)
|  Thoss (4)
|  Smart Araneta Coliseum
|  3–1
|  Boxscore

|- bgcolor="#bbffbb" 
| 1
|  May 15
|  Barangay Ginebra
|  87–70
|  Jazul (16)
|  Dozier (22)
|  Baguio, Casio (5)
|  Smart Araneta Coliseum
|  1–0
|  Boxscore
|- bgcolor="#bbffbb" 
| 2
|  May 17
|  Barangay Ginebra
|  104–90
|  Thoss (16)
|  Dozier (20)
|  
|  Mall of Asia Arena
|  2–0
|  Recap
|- bgcolor="#bbffbb" 
| 3
|  May 19
|  Barangay Ginebra
|  104–80
|  Dozier (27)
|  Dozier (20)
|  Dozier (7)
|  Smart Araneta Coliseum
|  3–0
|  Recap

Governors' Cup

Eliminations

Standings

Game log

|- bgcolor="#edbebf" 
| 1
|  August 23
|  GlobalPort
|  88–91
|  McKines (28)
|  McKines (13)
|  Casio (5)
|  Smart Araneta Coliseum
|  0–1
|  BoxscoreRecap
|- bgcolor="#bbffbb"
| 2
|  August 28
|  Rain or Shine
| 94–79
| McKines (30)
| McKines, Abueva (13)
| Thoss (7)
|  Mall of Asia Arena
| 1–1
| Boxscore

|- bgcolor="#bbffbb"
| 3
|  September 1
|  Barangay Ginebra San Miguel
| 102–99
| McKines (27)
| McKines (16)
| McKines, Abueva, Baguio (5)
|  Mall of Asia Arena
| 2–1
| Boxscore
|- bgcolor="#edbebf"
| 4
|  September 3
|  Meralco
| 74–84
| McKines (13)
| McKines (10)
| Baguio (5)
|  Smart Araneta Coliseum
| 2–2
| Boxscore
|- bgcolor="#bbffbb"
| 5
|  September 6
|  Talk 'N Text
| 112–104
| McKines (38)
| McKines (16)
| Jazul (4)
|  Mall of Asia Arena
| 3–2
| Boxscore
|- bgcolor="#edbebf"
| 6
|  September 10
|  San Mig Coffee
| 82–95
| McKines (32)
| McKines (15)
| Abueva (4)
|  Smart Araneta Coliseum
| 3–3
| Boxscore
|- bgcolor="#edbebf"
| 7
|  September 13
|  Petron
| 100–103
| McKines (33)
| McKines (10)
| Abueva, Baguio, Casio (5)
|  PhilSports Arena
| 3–4
| Boxscore
|- bgcolor="#bbffbb"
| 8
|  September 18
|  Barako Bull
| 91–89
| McKines (21)
| McKines (15)
| McKines (4)
|  Cuneta Astrodome
| 4–4
| Recap
|- bgcolor="#edbebf"
| 9
|  September 22
|  Air 21
| 107–121
| McKines (43)
| McKines (16)
| Thoss (6)
|  Mall of Asia Arena
| 4–5
| Boxscore

Playoffs

Game log

|- bgcolor="#bbffbb"
| 1
|  September 25
|  San Mig Coffee
|  112–105
|  McKines (38)
|  McKines (13)
|  Casio (7)
|  Smart Araneta Coliseum
|  1–0
|  Boxscore
|- bgcolor="#edbebf"
| 2
|  September 27
|  San Mig Coffee
|  73–83
|  McKines (24)
|  McKines (20)
|  McKines, Casio (5)
|  Mall of Asia Arena
|  1–1
|  Boxscore

Transactions

Trades

Pre-season

Commissioner's Cup

Recruited imports

References

Alaska Aces (PBA) seasons
Alaska